The murder of Tomislav Salopek, a Croatian expatriate worker, in Egypt, by the ISIL-affiliated Sinai Province, was the first such incident affecting a Croatian citizen. On 12 August 2015, Sinai Province published a still image purporting to show Salopek's decapitated body.

History
Salopek, a 31-year-old Croatian topographer working for French company Compagnie Générale de Géophysique (CGG), was kidnapped on July 22, 2015 while he was on his way to CGG's base near Cairo. An armed group stopped his car and forced his driver to leave the vehicle and then drove off with him in an unknown direction.

No one knew anything about him for almost ten days. On August 5, 2015 a video entitled A Message to the Egyptian Government showed up on the internet in which the ISIL-affiliated group, known as Sinai Province, made Mr. Salopek, who was kneeling while a masked man with a knife in his hand stands beside him, read a note in which ISIL had set a 48-hour deadline for Egyptian president Abdel Fattah al-Sisi to release "female Muslim prisoners from Egyptian prisons", warning that Mr. Salopek would be killed if their demands were not met.

A CGG spokesman later said that the kidnappers had contacted the company via e-mail, after first contacting Salopek's wife, and demanded tens of millions of euros for Salopek's release. The company responded on their mail the day after, urging kidnappers to give them  confirmation that Mr. Salopek was still alive. CGG sent that same e-mail every day, but there was no reply. It is suspected that Mr. Salopek was first kidnapped by one group that asked CGG for ransom, and that they eventually, for unexplained reasons, gave him to ISIL.

The Croatian Government immediately set off a strong diplomatic initiative in cooperation with the Egyptian Ministry of Foreign Affairs. Croatian Foreign Minister Vesna Pusić later stated that many other countries were also helping, including two of Croatia's most important allies, the United States and Germany, as well as many others such as France, the United Kingdom and other European Union member states. Russia and Serbia also offered their help. All this took place during the opening of the New Suez Canal. French President Francois Hollande talked about the importance of finding Mr. Salopek during the speech he gave at the opening ceremony of the New Suez Canal.

When the footage was published, Vesna Pusić, Salopek's wife Nataša, and agents of the Croatian Secret Service flew immediately to Cairo, where Mrs. Pusić met with her Egyptian colleague Sameh Shoukry. Croatian President Kolinda Grabar-Kitarović, a former NATO official, spoke with Egyptian President al-Sisi. The president of the main organization of Muslims in Croatia, Aziz Effendi Hasanović, sent a "Call for help to the Arab Republic of Egypt to save innocent life". He contacted, among others, Egyptian government officials and the Grand Mufti of Egypt, Shawki Allam.

In the next few days, four Egyptian security services in cooperation with the Egyptian army and the police launched a major rescue operation. The entire operation was personally led by the Egyptian Interior Minister Magdy Abdel Ghafar. Security forces searched the series of terrorist strongholds in the cities of Sheikh Zuweid, Rafah and Arish, as well as the Egypt-Libya and Gaza–Egypt borders.

On August 12, 2015, ISIL supporters started to share via social media a photograph purporting to show the decapitated body of Salopek. Buried in the sand next to the body was the flag used by ISIL. ISIL declared that the alleged murder of Salopek was revenge on Croatia for its participation in the international coalition against ISIL. Croatia sends small amounts of weapons like other European countries, such as Italy, Poland, Denmark and Albania.

Reactions

Domestic 
Croatian President Grabar-Kitarović, also Croatian commander-in-chief, said: "I want to say firmly, as long as there is one glimmer of hope and one ounce of a chance that our Tomislav is still alive we will continue working, searching and trying to save his life. I would like to express gratitude to all those who are working on this case. First of all to the Croatian institutions and second, to all friendly countries and agencies, including many friends from Arab countries who are trying to save Tomislav's life."

International 
Following publication of the image, many state's officials condemned it. 

British Foreign Minister Philip Hammond stated: "If these reports are accurate I strongly condemn the alleged  brutal murder of Croatian citizen Tomislav Salopek by ISIL in Egypt. My thoughts are with his family and colleagues and with the Croatian people. Britain will stand by Egypt and Croatia in continuing opposition to this inhumane type of terrorism." 

The United States Department of State issued a statement in which they wrote: "Our thoughts are with Mr. Salopek's family and friends and Croatian people. If this news is confirmed, the murder of Mr. Salopek will be staggering crime that is at the core of ISIL's extremist agenda. We strongly condemn the brutality towards innocent victims throughout the Middle East. United States stand shoulder to shoulder with the Croatian people and all our partners in the fight against terrorism." 

The German Foreign Ministry also condemned this crime in its statement: "This heinous act shows once again that the fanatical ideology of ISIS threats to all of us. Germany will in cooperation with its international partners continue to do everything possible to suppress ISIS, not only militarily, but above all politically." 

French Foreign Minister Laurent Fabius stated: "I'm terrified about the news that the terrorist group announced that it murdered Croatian hostage. If confirmed this despicable murder will confirm once more cowardly and barbaric nature of this terrorist organization. I express my solidarity with the Croatian government and the people as well as with the family of Mr. Salopek. France condemns all forms of terrorism and stand with Croatia and Egypt in fight against this scourge." 

The Spanish Government also reacted, stating: "We express our solidarity and full support to the family of Tomislav Salopek in these difficult times. We repeat to Croatia and Egypt our strong intention of continuing close cooperation in fight against terrorism, that ominous threat to the security and fundamental rights of all people. International community cannot remain silent and watch these mindless and brutal actions but must come together in a war against this disease of our society."

See also
Hidroelektra workers massacre, Islamist mass killing of Croatian workers in Algeria
David Haines, resided in Croatia before being kidnapped by ISIL
List of kidnappings
List of solved missing person cases

References

2010s missing person cases
2015 murders in Egypt
2015 in Croatia
Croatia–Egypt relations
July 2015 events in Egypt
Kidnapped Croatian people
Kidnappings by Islamists
Missing person cases in Egypt